Electrons and Holes in Semiconductors with Applications to Transistor Electronics  is a book by Nobel Prize winner William Shockley, first published in 1950.  It was a primary source, and was used as the first textbook, for scientists and engineers learning the new field of semiconductors as applied to the development of the transistor. This was the invention that led to electronic computers, ubiquitous communication devices, compact electronics controllers, and a host of other important inventions of the last half of the twentieth century.

The book was printed by D. Van Nostrand in New York, and went through many later printings.

Contents
The arrangement of chapters is as follows:

Part I INTRODUCTION TO TRANSISTOR ELECTRONICS

Chapter 1: THE BULK PROPERTIES OF SEMICONDUCTORS
Chapter 2: THE TRANSISTOR AS A CIRCUIT ELEMENT
Chapter 3: QUANTITATIVE STUDIES OF INJECTION OF HOLES AND ELECTRONS
Chapter 4: ON THE PHYSICAL THEORY OF TRANSISTORS
Chapter 5: QUANTUM STATES, ENERGY BANDS, AND BRILLOUIN ZONES

PART II  DESCRIPTIVE THEORY OF SEMICONDUCTORS
Chapter 6: VELOCITIES AND CURRENTS FOR ELECTRONS I N CRYSTALS
Chapter 7: ELECTRONS AND HOLES IN ELECTRIC AND MAGNETIC FIELDS
Chapter 8: INTRODUCTORY THEORY OF CONDUCTIVITY AND HALL EFFECT
Chapter 9: DISTRIBUTIONS OF QUANTUM STATES IN ENERGY
Chapter 10: FERMI-DIRAC STATISTICS FOR SEMICONDUCTORS
Chapter 11: MATHEMATICAL THEORY OF CONDUCTIVITY AND HALL EFFECT
Chapter 12: APPLICATIONS TO TRANSISTOR ELECTRONICS

PART III  QUANTUM MECHANICAL FOUNDATIONS
Chapter 13: INTRODUCTION TO PART III
Chapter 14: ELEMENTARY QUANTUM MECHANICS WITH CIRCUIT THEORY ANALOGUES
Chapter 15: THEORY OF ELECTRON AND HOLE VELOCITIES, CURRENTS AND ACCELERATIONS
Chapter 16: STATISTICAL MECHANICS FOR SEMICONDUCTORS 
Chapter 17: THE THEORY OF TRANSITION PROBABILITIES FOR HOLES AND ELECTRONS
APPENDIX A  Units
APPENDIX B  Periodic Table
APPENDIX C  Values of the physical constants
APPENDIX D  Energy conversion chart
NAME INDEX
SUBJECT INDEX

1950 non-fiction books
1950 in science
Physics textbooks